The following highways are numbered 727:

Canada
  (Saskatchewan)

Costa Rica
 National Route 727

United States